Vivian O'Callaghan (born 7 August 1944) is a former Irish Fianna Fáil politician. He served as a member of Seanad Éireann from 1987 to 1989. He was nominated by the Taoiseach Charles Haughey to the 18th Seanad in 1987. He was an unsuccessful candidate at the 1989 and 1993 Seanad elections. He is a former member of Cork County Council.

References

1944 births
Living people
Local councillors in County Cork
Fianna Fáil senators
Members of the 18th Seanad
People from County Cork
Nominated members of Seanad Éireann
Bantry Blues Gaelic footballers
Cork inter-county Gaelic footballers